Manivasagam (died 2001) was an Indian film director, producer and screenwriter who worked on Tamil films.

Career
Manivasagam began his career with Namma Ooru Poovatha (1990) and continued to work on village action dramas, often collaborating with actor Sarath Kumar. He often produced his own films, and credited his wife, Rajeswari Manivasagam, as the chief producer. The failure of his film, Nadodi Mannan  (1995), prompted the director to take a break from directing films. His final release was Mappillai Gounder (1997) which also opened to negative reviews and performed poorly at the box office. Manivasagam died in 2001.

Personal life
His son Gandhi made his directorial debut with Kalavani Mappillai starring Attakathi Dinesh.

Filmography
Director & Producer

Producer
Pattukottai Periyappa (1994)

References

20th-century Indian film directors
Tamil film directors
2001 deaths
Tamil film producers